The Climbers is a lost 1915 silent film produced by the Lubin Manufacturing Company and starring Gladys Hanson; it is the first filming of Clyde Fitch's 1901 play of the same name. Later versions of Fitch's play were made in 1919 as The Climbers with Corinne Griffith and in 1927 also as The Climbers with Irene Rich.

Plot
In order to keep his social-climbing wife and daughters in the lifestyle they are accustomed to, wealthy George Hunter makes some large investments in the stock market, but the stocks crash and he loses a great deal of money. His wealthy aunt offers to bail the family out, but complications ensue.

Cast
Gladys Hanson - Blanche Sterling
Walter Hitchcock - Dick Sterling
Dorothy DeWolfe - Richard Sterling Jr
Charles Brandt - John Hunter
George Soule Spencer - Ned Warden
Eleanor Barry - Mrs. Hunter
Ruth Bryan - Clara Hunter
Frankie Mann - Jessie Hunter
Edith Ritchie - Ruth Hunter
Clarence Elmer - Mr. Trotter (*Clarence Jay Elmer)
John Smiley - Dr. Steinhart
Peter Lang - Mr. Mason
Alan Quinn - Mr. Godesby
Ferdinand Tidmarsh - Mr. Walton
Walter Law - Mr. Ryder
 Betty Brice as 	Miss Godesby
 William H. Turner as Head Clerk

References

External links

1915 films
American silent feature films
Lost American films
American films based on plays
1915 drama films
Silent American drama films
Lubin Manufacturing Company films
American black-and-white films
1915 lost films
Lost drama films
Films directed by Barry O'Neil
1910s American films
1910s English-language films
English-language drama films